Boweya North is a town located in the Shire of Moira local government area. According to the 2016 Australian census, the population in the locality was 43.

Boweya North Creamery post office opened in 1902, renamed to Yeerip in August 1906 and was closed on 30 July 1932.

References

Towns in Victoria (Australia)
Shire of Moira